The Vial of Life  (aka Vial of L.I.F.E (Lifesaving Information for Emergencies)) is a program that allows individuals to have their complete medical information ready in their home for emergency personnel to reference during an emergency. This program is used to provide the patient’s medical information when a patient is not able to speak or remember this information. Vial of Life programs are commonly used by Senior citizens and are promoted by senior center organizations, and fire departments, and other community organizations. The decals, medical information forms, and other materials are typically free, and some may be downloaded and/or printed for free from the internet.

Background

It is unknown where and when the first Vial of Life program started. The Vial of Life was named after the prescription bottles that were originally used to store a medical information form inside the patient’s refrigerator. That prescription bottle would then be rubber banded to the bottom of the top-most shelf of the refrigerator door.

When a patient first starts with their Vial of Life kit, they must complete a medical information form about their medical history. All information on this form is optional, but the more information a patient provides the better. When paramedics have complete medical information, they are able to take measures to treat patients with special allergies or medical conditions appropriately in an emergency. Patients fill out information such as blood type, medical conditions, current medications, doctor’s name and number, allergies, insurance information, and emergency contacts. The most recent cardiogram (AKA EKG), and even a picture to help identify themselves.

Patients should also include advance health care directives. These three medical orders (DNR, MOST, POLST) must be signed by a physician and are the most frequently used medical directives. The DNR (Do Not Resuscitate order) expresses the patient's preference to decline Cardio-Pulmonary-Resuscitation (CPR). The names of the other more comprehensive physician orders (MOST form or POLST form) will vary by your state. In some states - it is called a MOST order form (Medical Order for Scope of Treatment) and in other states this document is called a POLST order form (Physician Order for Life Sustaining Treatment). These medical treatment preference documents are critical - especially for the elderly for whom resuscitation by emergency responders (EMTs) may cause painful and/or life-threatening injuries. Without these documents to guide the emergency responder patients must understand that EMTs are trained to automatically administer a full range of emergency life saving measures. For many patients such measures may be a wonderful blessing; for others who are elderly or frail or in very poor health, these same measures may be a curse. The patient who wishes to decline automatic EMT measures should be aware that most jurisdictions will require that the DNR, the MOST and the POLST documents included in the Vial of Life container be original versions including the physician's signature.

Another important directive is a legal document called the Health Care Power of Attorney (HCPOA) which designates a person to make medical decisions in the event the patient is no longer able to express their own preferences - due to illness or unconsciousness. This legal document generally requires notarized signatures of the patient and one or more witnesses to the patient's signature. Unlike the physician orders (DNR, MOST, POLST) the HCPOA will generally include a listing of various patient preferences for receiving or declining medical treatment. In some jurisdictions - the HCPOA may not carry the same weight with emergency responders (EMTs) because EMTs may not know what form is required for the HCPOA document to be legally binding and the HCPOA may be a multipage document using legal language not understood by the EMT.

It is encouraged that patients with complex medical histories fill out their medical information form with their doctor’s help. Also, many seniors benefit from bringing their completed Vial of Life form to doctor’s visits. Many seniors have trouble when they are overprescribed medications or prescribed conflicting medications by different doctors. The Vial of Life form is a practical way to keep all of that information in one place.

History
In 1981, the Sacramento chapter of the American Red Cross transferred their program and small amount of Vial of Life supplies over to Jeff Miller the Founder and CEO of Vital-Link, Inc. In the following years, Miller and his distributors kept the program going by giving free Vial of Life kits to their medical alert system subscribers as part of the service.

In 1998, Jeff Miller turned the program into a California Public Charity (which later gained 501(c)(3) status) called the Vial of Life Project. This charity supplies materials to seniors and others in need across the United States. It also supplies many Red Cross Chapters, governmental agencies, hospitals, pharmacies, senior centers, Eagle Scout projects, municipalities, etc. with free Vial of Life Kits or discounted decals for those needing mass quantities. For 32 years Jeff Miller’s organizations have utilized and improved this program, donating over 3 million Vial of Life kits. A number of organizations, like AARP support the program.

The Vial of Life has spawned many similar programs such as "File of Life" and "Vial A Life." Jeff Miller and the Vial of Life Project Charity left the Vial of Life name in public domain so that the Vial of life could be replicated and used by other agencies and organizations. Due to his historical claim to the Vial of Life name, no organization can copyright the name.

Vial of Life Project
Individuals can request free forms and UV coated decals on this website and can even save their information online through the secure online database. This allows patients to update and print their changing medical information. The vialoflife.com and vialoflife.org websites are live security protected sites where individuals and organizations can fill out the Vial of Life medical information form and print or edit their data.

Other Vial of Life Programs
While there are different types of Vial of Life programs out there, they all function similarly. When the paramedics arrive at the house, a decal on the front door (or a front window) alerts them that the resident uses the Vial of Life for their medical information. The decal will also direct the paramedics to where the information is kept, whether that is in a plastic bag on the outside of the fridge or a pill bottle inside of the refrigerator.

Originally, Vial of Life kits came with a plastic vial (empty pill bottle or other container). The vial would be labeled with a Vial of Life decal, and the completed medical information form would be placed inside. These plastic vials tend to get lost in the refrigerator, pushed towards the back of it over time and can prove hard to find for emergency crews. Nowadays, most programs (including the Vial of Life Project AKA Vial of Life.com) ask patients to place their completed medical form inside of a plastic Ziploc bag. This bag will go on the front of the refrigerator with a Vial of Life decal on it. While there are a few ways for this information to be kept in the home, this is the most common.

See also
Medical identification tag

References

External links

 
 
 
 

Emergency medical services in the United States